The 1979 Forward Chemicals Tournament was a non-ranking snooker tournament held on one occasion between October 1978 and January 1979.

Similar in format to previous Park Drive 2000 events, four professionals played each other three times in a round-robin format at various venues around the country, with the two best performing players reaching the final. Held at the Royal Exchange Theatre in Manchester, Ray Reardon defeated John Spencer 9–6 in the final.

Main draw

Round-robin

Knockout stage

References

1979 in snooker
1979 in Indian sport